The Fred T. Hunt Memorial Award is an American Hockey League trophy awarded annually to the player best exemplifying sportsmanship, determination, and dedication to hockey. The award is voted upon by players and members of the media around the American Hockey League. 

The award is named for Fred T. Hunt, a former player, general manager and governor for the Buffalo Bisons, earning six Calder Cup championships during his career. The original Hunt Trophy was donated by the Buffalo Sabres, whose entry to the National Hockey League resulted in the demise of the Buffalo Bisons.

Award winners

References

External links
Official AHL website
AHL Hall of Fame

American Hockey League trophies and awards